A cyclic compound (or ring compound) is a term for a compound in the field of chemistry in which one or more series of atoms in the compound is connected to form a ring. Rings may vary in size from three to many atoms, and include examples where all the atoms are carbon (i.e., are carbocycles), none of the atoms are carbon (inorganic cyclic compounds), or where both carbon and non-carbon atoms are present (heterocyclic compounds). Depending on the ring size, the bond order of the individual links between ring atoms, and their arrangements within the rings, carbocyclic and heterocyclic compounds may be aromatic or non-aromatic; in the latter case, they may vary from being fully saturated to having varying numbers of multiple bonds between the ring atoms. Because of the tremendous diversity allowed, in combination, by the valences of common atoms and their ability to form rings, the number of possible cyclic structures, even of small size (e.g., < 17 total atoms) numbers in the many billions. 

Adding to their complexity and number, closing of atoms into rings may lock particular atoms with distinct substitution (by functional groups) such that stereochemistry and chirality of the compound results, including some manifestations that are unique to rings (e.g., configurational isomers). As well, depending on ring size, the three-dimensional shapes of particular cyclic structures – typically rings of five atoms and larger – can vary and interconvert such that conformational isomerism is displayed. Indeed, the development of this important chemical concept arose historically in reference to cyclic compounds. Finally, cyclic compounds, because of the unique shapes, reactivities, properties, and bioactivities that they engender, are the majority of all molecules involved in the biochemistry, structure, and function of living organisms, and in man-made molecules such as drugs, pesticides, etc.

Structure and classification
A cyclic compound or ring compound is a compound in which at least some its atoms are connected to form a ring. Rings vary in size from three to many tens or even hundreds of atoms. Examples of ring compounds readily include cases where:
 all the atoms are carbon (i.e., are carbocycles), 
 none of the atoms are carbon (inorganic cyclic compounds), or where
 both carbon and non-carbon atoms are present (heterocyclic compounds).

Common atoms can (as a result of their valences) form varying numbers of bonds, and many common atoms readily form rings. In addition, depending on the ring size, the bond order of the individual links between ring atoms, and their arrangements within the rings, cyclic compounds may be aromatic or non-aromatic; in the case of non-aromatic cyclic compounds, they may vary from being fully saturated to having varying numbers of multiple bonds. As a consequence of the constitutional variability that is thermodynamically possible in cyclic structures, the number of possible cyclic structures, even of small size (e.g., <17 atoms) numbers in the many billions.

Moreover, the closing of atoms into rings may lock particular functional group–substituted atoms into place, resulting in stereochemistry and chirality being associated with the compound, including some manifestations that are unique to rings (e.g., configurational isomers); As well, depending on ring size, the three-dimensional shapes of particular cyclic structures — typically rings of five atoms and larger — can vary and interconvert such that conformational isomerism is displayed.

Carbocycles 
The vast majority of cyclic compounds are organic, and of these, a significant and conceptually important portion are composed of rings made only of carbon atoms (i.e., they are carbocycles).

Inorganic cyclic compounds
Inorganic atoms form cyclic compounds as well. Examples include sulfur (e.g. in polysulfides), silicon (e.g., in silanes), phosphorus (e.g., in phosphanes, metaphosphates and other phosphoric acid derivatives), and boron (e.g., sodium metaborate). When carbon in benzene is "replaced" by other elements, e.g., as in borabenzene, silabenzene, germanabenzene, stannabenzene, and phosphorine, aromaticity is retained, and so aromatic inorganic cyclic compounds are also known and well-characterized.

Heterocyclic compounds 
Cyclic compounds that have both carbon and non-carbon atoms present are termed heterocyclic compounds; alternatively the name can refer to inorganic cyclic compounds, such as siloxanes and borazines, that have more than one type of atom in their rings. Hantzsch–Widman nomenclature is recommended by the IUPAC for naming heterocycles, but many common names remain in regular use.

Macrocycles 

The term macrocycle is used for compounds having a rings of 8 or more atoms. Macrocycles may be fully carbocyclic, heterocyclic but having limited heteroatoms (e.g., in lactones and lactams), or be rich in heteroatoms and displaying significant symmetry (e.g., in the case of chelating macrocycles). Macrocycles can access a number of stable conformations, with preference to reside in conformations that minimize transannular nonbonded interactions within the ring (e.g., with the chair and chair-boat being more stable than the boat-boat conformation for cyclooctane, because of the interactions depicted by the arcs shown). Medium rings (8-11 atoms) are the most strained, with between 9-13 (kcal/mol) strain energy, and analysis of factors important in the conformations of larger macrocycles can be modeled using medium ring conformations. Conformational analysis of odd-membered rings suggests they tend to reside in less symmetrical forms with smaller energy differences between stable conformations.

Nomenclature 
IUPAC nomenclature has extensive rules to cover the naming of cyclic structures, both as core structures, and as substituents appended to alicyclic structures. The term macrocycle is used when a ring-containing compound has a ring of 12 or more atoms. The term polycyclic is used when more than one ring appears in a single molecule. Naphthalene is formally a polycyclic compound, but is more specifically named as a  bicyclic compound. Several examples of macrocyclic and polycyclic structures are given in the final gallery below.

The atoms that are part of the ring structure are called annular atoms.

Isomerism

Stereochemistry 
The closing of atoms into rings may lock particular atoms with distinct substitution by functional groups such that the result is stereochemistry and chirality of the compound, including some manifestations that are unique to rings (e.g., configurational isomers).

Conformational isomerism 

Depending on ring size, the three-dimensional shapes of particular cyclic structures—typically rings of 5-atoms and larger—can vary and interconvert such that conformational isomerism is displayed. Indeed, the development of this important chemical concept arose, historically, in reference to cyclic compounds. For instance, cyclohexanes—six membered carbocycles with no double bonds, to which various substituents might be attached, see image—display an equilibrium between two conformations, the chair and the boat, as shown in the image.

The chair conformation is the favored configuration, because in this conformation, the steric strain, eclipsing strain, and angle strain that are otherwise possible are minimized. Which of the possible chair conformations predominate in cyclohexanes bearing one or more substituents depends on the substituents, and where they are located on the ring; generally, "bulky" substituents—those groups with large volumes, or groups that are otherwise repulsive in their interactions—prefer to occupy an equatorial location. An example of interactions within a molecule that would lead to steric strain, leading to a shift in equilibrium from boat to chair, is the interaction between the two methyl groups in cis-1,4-dimethylcyclohexane. In this molecule, the two methyl groups are in opposing positions of the ring (1,4-), and their cis stereochemistry projects both of these groups toward the same side of the ring. Hence, if forced into the higher energy boat form, these methyl groups are in steric contact, repel one another, and drive the equilibrium toward the chair conformation.

Aromaticity

Cyclic compounds may or may not exhibit aromaticity; benzene is an example of an aromatic cyclic compound, while cyclohexane is non-aromatic. In organic chemistry, the term aromaticity is used to describe a cyclic (ring-shaped), planar (flat) molecule that exhibits unusual stability as compared to other geometric or connective arrangements of the same set of atoms. As a result of their stability, it is very difficult to cause aromatic molecules to break apart and to react with other substances. Organic compounds that are not aromatic are classified as aliphatic compounds—they might be cyclic, but only aromatic rings have especial stability (low reactivity).

Since one of the most commonly encountered aromatic systems of compounds in organic chemistry is based on derivatives of the prototypical aromatic compound benzene (an aromatic hydrocarbon common in petroleum and its distillates), the word “aromatic” is occasionally used to refer informally to benzene derivatives, and this is how it was first defined. Nevertheless, many non-benzene aromatic compounds exist. In living organisms, for example, the most common aromatic rings are the double-ringed bases in RNA and DNA. A functional group or other substituent that is aromatic is called an aryl group.

The earliest use of the term “aromatic” was in an article by August Wilhelm Hofmann in 1855. Hofmann used the term for a class of benzene compounds, many of which do have odors (aromas), unlike pure saturated hydrocarbons. Today, there is no general relationship between aromaticity as a chemical property and the olfactory properties of such compounds (how they smell), although in 1855, before the structure of benzene or organic compounds was understood, chemists like Hofmann were beginning to understand that odiferous molecules from plants, such as terpenes, had chemical properties we recognize today are similar to unsaturated petroleum hydrocarbons like benzene.

In terms of the electronic nature of the molecule, aromaticity describes a conjugated system often made of alternating single and double bonds in a ring. This configuration allows for the electrons in the molecule’s pi system to be delocalized around the ring, increasing the molecule's stability. The molecule cannot be represented by one structure, but rather a resonance hybrid of different structures, such as with the two resonance structures of benzene. These molecules cannot be found in either one of these representations, with the longer single bonds in one location and the shorter double bond in another (See Theory below). Rather, the molecule exhibits bond lengths in between those of single and double bonds. This commonly seen model of aromatic rings, namely the idea that benzene was formed from a six-membered carbon ring with alternating single and double bonds (cyclohexatriene), was developed by August Kekulé (see History section below). The model for benzene consists of two resonance forms, which corresponds to the double and single bonds superimposing to produce six one-and-a-half bonds. Benzene is a more stable molecule than would be expected without accounting for charge delocalization.

Principal uses
Because of the unique shapes, reactivities, properties, and bioactivities that they engender, cyclic compounds are the largest majority of all molecules involved in the biochemistry, structure, and function of living organisms, and in the man-made molecules (e.g., drugs, herbicides, etc.) through which man attempts to exert control over nature and biological systems.

Synthetic reactions

Important general reactions for forming rings

There are a variety of specialized reactions whose use is solely the formation of rings, and these will be discussed below. In addition to those, there are a wide variety of general organic reactions that historically have been crucial in the development, first, of understanding the concepts of ring chemistry, and second, of reliable procedures for preparing ring structures in high yield, and with defined orientation of ring substituents (i.e., defined stereochemistry). These general reactions include:
 Acyloin condensation;
 Anodic oxidations; and
 the Dieckmann condensation as applied to ring formation.

Ring-closing reactions
In organic chemistry, a variety of synthetic procures are particularly useful in closing carbocyclic and other rings; these are termed ring-closing reactions. Examples include:
 alkyne trimerisation;
 the Bergman cyclization of an enediyne;
 the Diels–Alder, between a conjugated diene and a substituted alkene, and other cycloaddition reactions;
 the Nazarov cyclization reaction, originally being the cyclization of a divinyl ketone;
 various radical cyclizations;
 ring-closing metathesis reactions, which also can be used to accomplish a specific type of polymerization;
 the Wenker synthesis converting a beta amino alcohol to an aziridine
 other reactions, such as an amino group reacting with a hydroxy group, as in the biosynthesis of solanine

Ring-opening reactions 
A variety of further synthetic procedures are particularly useful in opening carbocyclic and other rings, generally which contain a double bound or other functional group "handle" to facilitate chemistry; these are termed ring-opening reactions. Examples include:
 ring opening metathesis, which can also be used to accomplish a specific type of polymerization.

Ring expansion and ring contraction reactions

Ring expansion and contraction reactions are common in organic synthesis, and are frequently encountered in pericyclic reactions. Ring expansions and contractions can involve the insertion of a functional group such as the case with Baeyer–Villiger oxidation of cyclic ketones, rearrangements of cyclic carbocycles as seen in intramolecular Diels-Alder reactions, or collapse or rearrangement of bicyclic compounds as several examples.

Examples

Simple, mono-cyclic examples 
The following are examples of simple and aromatic carbocycles, inorganic cyclic compounds, and heterocycles:

Complex and polycyclic examples 
The following are examples of cyclic compounds exhibiting more complex ring systems and stereochemical features:

See also
Effective molarity
Lactone
Open-chain compound

References

Further reading
 Jürgen-Hinrich Fuhrhop & Gustav Penzlin, 1986, "Organic synthesis: concepts, methods, starting materials," Weinheim, BW, DEU:VCH, see , accessed 19 June 2015.
 Michael B. Smith & Jerry March, 2007, "March's Advanced Organic Chemistry: Reactions, Mechanisms, and Structure," 6th Ed., New York, NY, USA:Wiley & Sons, see , accessed 19 June 2015.
 Francis A. Carey & Richard J. Sundberg, 2006, "Title Advanced Organic Chemistry: Part A: Structure and Mechanisms," 4th Edn., New York, NY, USA:Springer Science & Business Media, see , accessed 19 June 2015.
 Michael B. Smith, 2011, "Organic Chemistry: An Acid—Base Approach," Boca Raton, FL, USA:CRC Press, see , accessed 19 June 2015.  [May not be most necessary material for this article, but significant content here is available online.]
 Jonathan Clayden, Nick Greeves & Stuart Warren, 2012, "Organic Chemistry," Oxford, Oxon, GBR:Oxford University Press, see , accessed 19 June 2015.
 László Kürti & Barbara Czakó, 2005, "Strategic Applications of Named Reactions in Organic Synthesis: Background and Detailed Mechanisms, Amsterdam, NH, NLD:Elsevier Academic Press, 2005ISBN 0124297854, see , accessed 19 June 2015.

External links 
 
 

 
Molecular geometry